Ap Lei Chau Estate is a public housing estate in Ap Lei Chau, Hong Kong Island, Hong Kong. It is the first public housing estate in Ap Lei Chau. Completed in two phases in 1980 and 1982 respectively, the estate consists of 8 residential blocks providing 4,453 flats. It was one of the public housing estates built from 1980 to 1982 to accommodate people affected by a major fire in Aberdeen Typhoon Shelter.

Houses

Demographics
According to the 2016 by-census, Ap Lei Chau Estate had a population of 14,504. The median age was 53.1 and the majority of residents (97.1 per cent) were of Chinese ethnicity. The average household size was 2.8 people. The median monthly household income of all households (i.e. including both economically active and inactive households) was HK$21,650.

Politics
Ap Lei Chau Estate is located in Ap Lei Chau Estate constituency of the Southern District Council. It is currently represented by Lam Yuk-chun, who was elected in the 2019 elections.

See also

Public housing estates in Pok Fu Lam, Aberdeen and Ap Lei Chau

References

Ap Lei Chau
Residential buildings completed in 1980
Residential buildings completed in 1982
Public housing estates in Hong Kong
1980 establishments in Hong Kong